Donald Dwain Brumm (born October 4, 1941) is a former American football defensive lineman in the National Football League (NFL) for the St. Louis Cardinals and the Philadelphia Eagles. He went to one Pro Bowl during his ten-year career.  Brumm played college football at Purdue University and was drafted in the first round (13th overall) of the 1963 NFL Draft.  He was also selected in the third round of the 1963 AFL Draft by the Kansas City Chiefs.

Brumm twice scored NFL touchdowns with recovered fumbles. On October 10, 1965, he ran 10 yards with a fumble for a score in a 37–16 Cardinals victory over the Washington Redskins. He ran 17 yards for a touchdown on September 22, 1968, in a St. Louis loss to the San Francisco 49ers.

A three-sport athlete at Hammond High School in Hammond, Indiana, Brumm then became a standout lineman for Purdue. A first-team All-American selection by both Associated Press and United Press International, he played in the Hula Bowl and East West Shrine Game as well as in a 1963 College All-Star Game victory over the Green Bay Packers prior to his pro football rookie season.

He was a 2011 inductee of the Indiana Football Hall of Fame.

References

1941 births
Living people
American football defensive linemen
Purdue Boilermakers football players
St. Louis Cardinals (football) players
Philadelphia Eagles players
Eastern Conference Pro Bowl players